The 1989 Taça de Portugal Final was the final match of the 1988–89 Taça de Portugal, the 49th season of the Taça de Portugal, the premier Portuguese football cup competition organized by the Portuguese Football Federation (FPF). The match was played on 28 May 1989 at the Estádio Nacional in Oeiras, and opposed two Primeira Liga sides: Belenenses and Benfica. Belenenses defeated Benfica 2–1 to claim the Taça de Portugal for a third time in their history.

In Portugal, the final was televised live on RTP. As a result of Belenenses winning the Taça de Portugal, the Azuis do Restelo qualified for the 1989 Supertaça Cândido de Oliveira where they took on their cup opponents who won the 1988–89 Primeira Divisão.

Match

Details

References

1989
Taca
C.F. Os Belenenses matches
S.L. Benfica matches